Pengelly is a surname. Notable people with the surname include:

 Edna Pengelly (1874–1959), New Zealand teacher and nurse
 Emma Little-Pengelly (born 1979), Northern Ireland politician
 Jessica Pengelly (born 1991), South African-born Australian swimmer
 Melville Pengelly (1901–1973), New Zealand cricket umpire
 Nigel Pengelly (1925–2010), Canadian politician
 Thomas Pengelly (merchant) (fl. c.1660–1715), London merchant with whom Richard Cromwell lodged
 Sir Thomas Pengelly (judge) (1675–1730), judge and Member of Parliament for Cockermouth, Cumberland, son of the above
 Thomas Pengelly (disambiguation), multiple people
 William Pengelly (1812–1894), British geologist and archaeologist

Cornish-language surnames